Don Juan Pond is a small and very shallow hypersaline lake in the western end of Wright Valley (South Fork), Victoria Land, Antarctica,  west from Lake Vanda. It is wedged between the Asgard Range to the south and the Dais Range to the north. On the west end is a small tributary and a rock glacier. With a salinity level of 33.8%, Don Juan Pond is the saltiest of the Antarctic lakes.

Don Juan Pond was discovered in 1961. It was named for two helicopter pilots, Lt. Don Roe and Lt. John Hickey, who piloted the helicopter involved with the first field party investigating the pond.

Salinity

Don Juan Pond is a shallow, flat-bottom, hyper-saline pond. It has the second-highest total dissolved solids on record, 1.3 times greater salinity than the Dead Sea. Salinity varies over time from 200 to 474 g/L, dominated by calcium chloride. It is the only Antarctic hypersaline lake that almost never freezes. It has been described as a groundwater discharge zone. The area around Don Juan Pond is covered with sodium chloride and calcium chloride salts that have precipitated as the water evaporated. 

The area and volume of Don Juan Pond vary over time. However, in recent years the pond has shrunk considerably. The maximum depth in 1993–1994 was described as "a foot deep". Most of the remaining water was in depressions around large boulders in the pond.

Life
Studies of lifeforms in the hypersaline (and/or brine) water of Don Juan Pond have been ambiguous.

Literature

References

External links

 Great Zoom into Don Juan Pond, Antarctica
 
 Don Juan Pond GigaPan picture

Lakes of Victoria Land
Saline lakes of Antarctica
Endorheic lakes of Antarctica
McMurdo Dry Valleys